Richard Scott (born 14 December 1968, Middlesbrough, England) is a South African artist, residing in Cape Town and well known for the phrase Naive meets Pop art to describe his unique take on Art. He is very well known for his art both in South Africa and internationally.

Richard matriculated in 1986 from Norkem Part High School in Kempton Park, Gauteng. Although he attended art classes throughout his high school term, he did not pursue, what would become his profession, until 13 years passed. Only in 2001 did Richard make the decision to become a full-time artist. Before pursuing a career as a full-time artist, Richard Scott worked as a technical illustrator and IT specialist.  In 2004 he got involved with Mark Atwood, at the Lithography Artist Press in Mpumalanga, South Africa. In 2008 Richard studied silk screening with Keip Silk Screening in Johannesburg.

The art of Richard Scott is very distinctive as he always uses a thick black line in all of his work. His subject matter ranges from the female figure to cats, cars, lighthouses, and planes. Richard Scott has had numerous "group exhibitions" under the label "Naive meets Pop".

The Media used in Richard's art consists of: Pencil, pastel, watercolour, acrylic, oil, lithography, etching, sculpture, new media, and photography

Richard's work is mostly sold outside South Africa. Art Collectors in Europe own at least 75% of the 2,500 paintings he has produced in the last 10 years.

Family 
Richard Scott has two children, Richard and Angelina. Richard's father and mother, Len and Janet Scott, immigrated to South Africa in 1969, when Richard was 9 months old. Richard's parents then immigrated back to England in 2004 to retire. Richard has one living sister Angela, who resides in England, and one deceased sister, Susan, who died in 2010 as a result of granulomatosis with polyangiitis.

Childhood
Richard was born at 5 Linton Road Normanby, Redcar and Cleveland, near Middlesbrough. The house is still standing today and is owned by the people who bought it from his parents in 1969. Richard was born at 10pm and weighed 4 kg. Within the first week of arriving in South Africa, Richard fell off the bed in the hotel where his parents were staying and had to have two stitches in his upper lip, which the doctor did without any anesthetic, hence the scar on his lip. Richard was then diagnosed with gluten intolerance and was put on a gluten free diet for two years. In 1971, Richard contracted chickenpox, with no side effect. In 1976, Richard contracted mumps, also, with no side effects.

Schooling 
Richard started schooling in Benoni, Gauteng at Pinegrove Primary School, Springs, Gauteng. Richard was a loner, and thus received good grades throughout School. At the age of 12 Richard's parents moved back to Darlington, England briefly for 18 months. Upon their return to South Africa in 1981, Richard Entered into Birch Acres Primary School, in Kempton Park, Gauteng to complete his final year at primary school.

In 1982 Richard entered High School at Norkem Park High, where he completed his schooling in 1986. In 1984 Richard had the choice of subjects and choose French over art. He soon realised his friends all took art and so he switched. Richard recalls art been a bore under the tuition of Mrs. Moolman. But it was in his final year, under the tuition of Mr. Fuel, that Richard really flourished in art. It was Mr. Fuel's teaching style that allowed Richard to express himself.

Exhibitions 

2002
 January – Hout Bay Gallery, Group Exhibition
 March – Bellville Association of Visual Arts
 April – Bay Art Gallery, Kalk Bay, Group Exhibition
 May – Knysna Fine Art Gallery, The Art of Colour Exhibition with Vgallery
 June – Art Channel Diversity 4 Exhibition
 June – Ekurhuleni Fine Arts Finalist Exhibition

2003
 March –  Lennox Gallery, Exhibition with Vanessa Berlein, London
 June – AVA Gallery Cape Town, Members Exhibition
 July  – Hout Bay Gallery, Group Exhibition
 August – Grosvenorvilla Art Gallery, Cape Town, Group Exhibition
 September – VEO Gallery, Cape Town, Art De Waterkant Group Exhibition
 October – Brett Keble Awards (Inaugural), Cape Town, Finalist Exhibition
 December – VEO Gallery, Cape Town, Exhibition with Chris Basson
 December – VEO Gallery, Cape Town, Art of the Motorcycle – Harley-Davidson Centenary

2004
 January – Sue Lipschitz Gallery, Plettenberg Bay, Group Exhibition
 January – Rossouw Gallery Cape Town, White is a Colour Group Exhibition
 September – Solo at Winchester Mansions, Cape Town
 October – Brett Keble Awards 2004 Cape Town, Finalist Exhibition
 November – AVA Absolut Vodka 9 group exhibition
 November – Group exhibition at Muiz Studio, Muizenberg
 December – Group exhibition at MOJA MODERN, Johannesburg
 December – VEO Gallery, Cape Town, Solo, Pop Goes The Easel

2005
 April – Rossouw Gallery Cape Town, Solo, Light Years Away
 May – Woolworths in store, Group exhibition
 September – Moving Gallery, Antwerp, Belgium, Group Exhibition
 November – AVA Absolut Secret 10 – Absolut Finale
 December – VEO Gallery, Cape Town, Wavesacpes, Group Exhibition
 December – KIZO Art Gallery, Kwazulu Natal, Durban, Solo
 December – VEO Gallery, Cape Town, Richard Scott invites Gavin Rain to exhibit with him
 December – 34LONG, Cape Town, group exhibition, East West
 
2006
 January – Worldart, Hamilton Russell, Hermanus, Solo
 February – Rossouw Gallery, Cape Town, An Evening of Erotica, Group Exhibition
 April – Hout Bay Gallery, Solo
 March – 34LONG, Cape Town, group exhibition, Metal
 July  – CTICC, Solo, Supermodel 2006
 August – KIZO Art Gallery, Aston Martin Exhibitionroom, Sandton, Group Exhibition
 August – KIZO Art Gallery, Decorex, Johannesburg, Group Exhibition
 October – Moving Gallery, Leuven, Belgium, Speechless, Group Exhibition
 December – KIZO Art Gallery, Kwazulu Natal, Durban, Group Exhibition
 December – VEO Gallery, Cape Town, Wavesacpes, Group Exhibition

2007
 January – Worldart, Cape Town, Solo
 February – Kizo Art Gallery, Durban, Homemakers, Group Exhibition
 February –  VEO Gallery, Cape Town, Wavesacpes, Group Exhibition
 March – Marlies Dekkers, Amsterdam, Open Closed
 April – Worldart, Johannesburg, Solo
 April – Kizo Art Gallery, Decorex, Cape Town, Group Exhibition
 April – Cape Town School of Photography, Group Exhibition
 May – Winchester Mansions, Cape Town, Solo
 May – Rust-en-Vrede, Durbanville, Cape Town, Solo
 June – Worldart, Cape Town, Beauty and the Beasts, solo
 August – Kizo Art Gallery, Decorex JHB Galagher, AffordArt
 August – Kizo Art Gallery, Cape Town, Homemakers, Group Exhibition
 August – Kizo Art Gallery, Durban, Homemakers, Group Exhibition
 September – Paarl, Cultivaria, Die voël met die af vlerk, Group Exhibition
 September – Kizo, Durban The Heritage Exhibition, Group Exhibition
 October – Kizo Art Gallery, Heritage, Group Exhibition
 October – Kizo Art Gallery, Glamour Aid, Group Exhibition
 November – Hawaan Evening, Durban, Group Exhibition
 November – Kizo Art Gallery, Durban, Umdwebo Festival, Group Exhibition

2008
 January – Worldart, Cape Town, Solo
 January – Kizo Art Gallery, Durban, Oubaai, Group Exhibition
 February –  VEO Gallery, Cape Town, Wavescapes, Group Exhibition
 February – Sexpo, Durban, Group Exhibition
 March – Demelza Prettejohn, England, Affordable Art Fair, London
 March – Worldart, Cape Town, Solo, Hypnotized
 March – Peacock Gallery, Franschhoek, Solo Cottage Fromage
 April – Kizo, Durban, Erotica, Group Exhibition
 May – Demelza Prettejohn, England, Bristol Art Fair, Bristol
 May – Kizo, Durban, Ready Made, Group Exhibition
 July  –  Stephen Falcke, Decorex, Johannesburg
 August – Watercomfort, Johannesburg, Solo
 September – Kizo, Durban, The Heritage Exhibition, Group Exhibition
 October – Demelza Prettejohn, England, Manchester Art Fair, Manchester
 November – Watercomfort, Johannesburg, Solo, VISI magazine
 November – Die Meul, Philadelphia, Cape Town, One day only art splash, Group Exhibition
 
2009
 February – Luca Carniato, Treviso, Italy, The South African Wave, Solo Exhibition
 February – Lisa King, Cape Town, Group Exhibition
 March – Peacock Gallery, Franschhoek, Solo Cottage Fromage, Solo Exhibition
 March – Luca Carniato, Treviso, Italy, Gas Clothing Store Instore, Group Exhibition
 March – Carniato, Treviso, Italy, Piola Instore, Solo Exhibition
 March – Demelza Prettejohn, England, Affordable Art Fair, London
 April – Imbizo Gallery, Balito, Landscapes and Trees, Group Exhibition
 April – Lisa King, Cape Town, Art on the Piazza, Group Exhibition
 May – Sexpo, Cape Town International Convention Centre, Solo Exhibition
 May – Imbizo Gallery, Balito, Heritage Art Exhibition, Group Exhibition
 June – The Ars Italica Gallery, Milan, The South African Wave Exhibition, Group Exhibition
 June – POP Chicago Gallery, Chicago, America, Group Exhibition
 September – Walker Bay, Hermanus, Spring Exhibition, Group Exhibition
 November – Lisa King, Cape Town, Group Exhibition

2010
 March – Imbizo Gallery, Balito, Shapes and Scapes, Group Exhibition
 March – Demelza Prettejohn, England, Affordable Art Fair, London
 March – Miart, Luca Carniato, Milan, Italy, Group Exhibition
 December – Felix Pakhuis, Antwerp, Belgium, Solo Exhibition

2011
 January – La Modella Nel Ritratto Contemporaneo, Italy, Group Show
 March – Demelza Prettejohn, England, Affordable Art Fair, London

2017
 November – ART-Gallery.be, Knokke, Belgium

See also
 List of South African artists

References 
 Richard Scott Exhibiting
 Biography and examples of artworks 
 Pop Chicago Gallery 
 Gallery Art Directory 
 Highlights: The Affordable Art Fair, London
 Starfish Charity Auction 2011

External links 
 Official Website 
 Essays

South African artists
People from Gauteng
1968 births
Living people